Oleksiy Vitaliyovych Savchenko (born 27 September 1993) is a Ukrainian professional footballer who plays as a midfielder for Obolon Kyiv.

Career
Savchenko is a product of the UFC Kharkiv youth sportive school and in the beginning of 2011 he signed a contract with FC Dynamo Kyiv.

He spent his career in the Ukrainian First League club FC Dynamo-2 Kyiv. In July 2015 Savchenko went on loan to FC Hoverla in the Ukrainian Premier League and made his debut in the Ukrainian Premier League for this club in a match against FC Dnipro Dnipropetrovsk as the main-squad player on 19 July 2015.

References

External links
Profile at Official FFU Site (Ukr)

1993 births
Living people
Ukrainian footballers
FC Dynamo-2 Kyiv players
FC Hoverla Uzhhorod players
Association football midfielders
Ukrainian Premier League players
FC Cherkashchyna players
FC Poltava players
FC Chornomorets Odesa players
FC Polissya Zhytomyr players
FC Obolon-Brovar Kyiv players
Sportspeople from Kharkiv Oblast